The 1876 Invercargill mayoral election was held on 21 July 1876.

John Cuthbertson was elected mayor.

Results
The following table gives the election results:

References

1876 elections in New Zealand
Mayoral elections in Invercargill